On December 10, 2020, during a visit to Baku, the capital of the Republic of Azerbaijan, Turkish president Recep Tayyip Erdoğan attended a parade for the victory of Azerbaijan in the Karabakh region following a military conflict with neighboring Armenia. There, Erdoğan read parts of a controversial poem with connotations of Azerbaijani irredentism, sparking tensions with neighboring Iran.

Poem and context

The poem of Bakhtiyar Vahabzadeh recited by Turkish president Recep Tayyip Erdoğan, called Gülüstan, laments how the Aras River has separated Azerbaijani-speaking people in the Republic of Azerbaijan and Iran and is a symbol of the pan-Turkism doctrine, that seeks incorporation of the Turkic-speaking people of Iran. The poem is part of a literary genre conceived in the Azerbaijan SSR of the Soviet Union, the context of which is related to Iran's Azerbaijan region. 

This Soviet Azerbaijani literary genre, also referred to as "a literature of longing", had become dominant in the 1950s and 1960s in the Azerbaijan SSR. As a rule, works that belonged to this category, as the historian and political scientist Zaur Gasimov explains, "were examples of blatant Azerbaijani nationalism stigmatizing the “division” of the nation along the river Araxes, as well as denunciations of economic and cultural exploitation of Iranian Azerbaijanis, etc." Such themes, including the poem by Vahabzadeh, were incorporated into the history and literature curricula of the Azerbaijan SSR. Gasimov adds: "An important by-product of this literary genre was strongly articulated anti-Iranian rhetoric. Tolerance and even support of this anti-Iranian rhetoric by the communist authorities were obvious." Vahabzadeh, for instance, was decorated on numerous occasions by the ruling communist authorities for his works which were incorporated into school curriculum in the Azerbaijan SSR.

The section of the poem recited by Erdogan said: "They separated the Aras River and filled it with rocks and rods. I will not be separated from you. They have separated us forcibly." The poem infuriated Iranians as it reminds them of the Treaty of Turkmenchay (1828), which Qajar Iran was forced to sign with the Russian Empire which resulted in the cessation of swaths of lands in the South Caucasus to Russia. The lands ceded by the treaty, which set the boundaries between Iran and Russia at the Aras River, now constitute large parts of the Republic of Azerbaijan and Armenia, and even parts of Turkey. The Treaty of Turkmenchay continues to be viewed as a source of shame brought on Iran by the Qajar dynasty that ruled Iran until 1925.

Reactions
As narrated by Al-Jazeera, after a video of Erdogan’s speech in Baku circulated online, Persian-language social media was awash with angry posts that demanded Iran give a resolute response. Dozens protested in Tabriz (one of the largest cities in Iran populated by Azerbaijanis) in front of the Turkish consulate, and defended Iran’s territorial integrity. On social media, many Iranians quoted Sattar Khan, an important figure in the Iranian Constitutional Revolution, and who was of Azerbaijani origin. Sattar Khan is considered a national hero in Iran as he always prioritised Iran's national integrity and soil above anything else. On social media, Iranians were reportedly also united "in saying Erdogan must refer to Iran’s history, which spans thousands of years, before supporting separation."

On 11 December, Iranian foreign minister Javad Zarif said via Twitter:

Iranian foreign ministry spokesman Saeed Khatibzadeh tweeted: "The Turkish ambassador was told that basing foreign policy on illusions is not wise", advising, as narrated by Al-Jazeera, Turkish officials to read history. A vast majority of Iran's parliament members (225 out of 290), signed a statement which was subsequently read out loud on television, strongly condemning Erdogan's remarks. According to the joint statement, the poem was considered "surprising and unacceptable".

The Turkish government in response summoned Iran's envoy to protest against the remarks made by the Iranian government.

According to the deputy speaker of parliament, Ali Nikzad: "Mr Erdogan, you have either not read history or wish to distort it". The Tabrizi representative in the Iranian parliament, Mohammad Reza Mirtajodini, tweeted: "Erdogan has overstepped his boundaries and has apparently forgotten where he had turned to on the night of the 2016 coup!"

According to Turkish presidential communications director Fahrettin Altun: "We condemn the use of offensive language toward our president and our country over the recitation of a poem, whose meaning has been deliberately taken out of context". Altun added that "passionately reflects the emotional experience of an aggrieved people due to Armenia’s occupation of Azerbaijani lands (...) It does not include any references to Iran. Nor is that country implied in any way, shape or form". Turkish foreign minister Mevlüt Çavuşoğlu stated that "baseless and heavy statements made by Iran and aimed at our president are unacceptable". Çavuşoğlu assured that "Erdogan fully respects Iran’s national sovereignty and territorial integrity".

Aftermath
Days later, President Hassan Rouhani said that Iran can move beyond row with Turkey over the Erdoğan poem. As narrated by Reuters, Rouhani told: "In my opinion, with the explanations (Turkish officials) gave, we can move beyond this issue, but the sensitivity of our people is very important".

See also

 Iran–Turkey relations
 Azerbaijan–Iran relations
 Azerbaijan–Turkey relations
 Anti-Iranian sentiment#In the Turkic world
 Whole Azerbaijan
 Erdoganism

References

2020 controversies
2020 in international relations
2020 in Azerbaijan
2020 in Iran
December 2020 events in Turkey
21st century in Baku
Turkish nationalism
Azerbaijani nationalism
Pan-Turkism
Aftermath of the 2020 Nagorno-Karabakh war
Recep Tayyip Erdoğan controversies
Anti-Iranian sentiments
Iran–Turkey relations
Azerbaijan–Iran relations
Azerbaijan–Turkey relations